Bhapura or Bapura is a village in Panipat district of Haryana, India. It is one of the 30 villages under the municipal committee of Samalkha.

References 

Villages in Panipat district